"All I Know" is a song written by American songwriter Jimmy Webb, first recorded by Art Garfunkel on his 1973 debut solo album, Angel Clare, released by Columbia Records. Instrumental backing was provided by members of the Wrecking Crew, L.A. session musicians. Garfunkel's version is the best known and highest-charting version, peaking at number nine on the Billboard Hot 100 and number one on the Easy Listening chart for four weeks in October 1973.
Garfunkel's version begins with a solo piano, before he begins to sing. When the orchestration is beginning to fade out, the solo piano takes over, playing melodic passages to the song's end.

Reception
In his review for Allmusic, Joe Viglione wrote that Jimmy Webb's own version of the song, recorded for Ten Easy Pieces in 1996, had "none of the gloss" of Garfunkel's hit version, but more soul. Viglione continued:

Chart history

Weekly charts

Year-end charts

The Linda Ronstadt connection
More recently, Webb invited Linda Ronstadt to join him in a duet version for his 2010 album Just Across the River. Ronstadt had just announced her retirement from singing when Webb sent her an email describing his new CD of duets. Webb asked if she would sing "All I Know" with him, with just a guitar backup. Ronstadt called him and said, "Damn it, you've gotten me interested in that song." Webb later recalled, "There was a poignancy to that moment ... because I didn’t know if she'd ever sing again. Her voice sounds elegantly beautiful on 'All I Know' ... I loved the meticulous way she covered my voice."

Elsewhere in popular culture
The song continues to appear in popular culture. It was featured in the season 2 finale and the series finale of the American drama series Nip/Tuck.

Garfunkel's second rendition of the song was also used in a video montage in the ending credits of "The Grass Is Always Greener," Episode 12 in Season 3 of the American comedy-drama series Boy Meets World.

Recorded versions
 Art Garfunkel on his album Angel Clare (1973)
 Art Garfunkel on his album Up 'til Now (1993)
 Amy Holland and Michael McDonald on the soundtrack album One Life to Live (1994)
 Jimmy Webb on his album Ten Easy Pieces (1996)
 Michael Feinstein on his album Only One Life: The Songs of Jimmy Webb (2003)
 Five for Fighting on the soundtrack album Chicken Little (2005)
 Jimmy Webb on his album Live and at Large (2007)
 Alan Cumming on his album I Bought a Blue Car Today (2009)
 Jimmy Webb and Linda Ronstadt on the album Just Across the River (2010)

See also
List of number-one adult contemporary singles of 1973 (U.S.)

References

External links
 

1973 singles
Art Garfunkel songs
Michael McDonald (musician) songs
Amy Holland songs
Songs written by Jimmy Webb
Pop ballads
Song recordings produced by Roy Halee
Male–female vocal duets
1973 songs
Columbia Records singles